The discography of You Am I, an Australian alternative rock band, consists of eleven studio albums, two live albums, two compilation albums, six extended plays, thirty singles and two video albums.

Albums

Studio albums

Live albums

Compilation albums

Video albums

Extended plays

Singles

References

External links

Discographies of Australian artists
Rock music group discographies